Tahmid Air was a short-lived airline based in Almaty, Kazakhstan, which operated charter flights out of Almaty International Airport using a fleet of two Boeing 737-200 aircraft.

History
Tahmid Air acquired its two aircraft in May and July 2008, marking the launch of the airline's business. On 1 April 2009, the airline license was withdrawn, shortly before the company appeared on the list of air carriers banned in the European Union. At that time, all commercial Kazakh airlines except Air Astana were included in this list because of the poor maintenance standards in the country.

References

External links

Defunct airlines of Kazakhstan
Airlines established in 2008
Airlines disestablished in 2009